The Koh Chang frog or Koh Chang wart frog (Limnonectes kohchangae) is a species of frog in the family Dicroglossidae. It is found in east Thailand and southern Cambodia. Records from Laos and Vietnam represent other species.

Limnonectes kohchangae inhabit evergreen hill forests as well as modified habitats such as gardens and plantations. They breed in slow-moving sections of streams but outside the breeding season are found dispersed on the forest floor. There are no major threats to this species; it is not considered threatened by the IUCN.

References

Limnonectes
Amphibians of Cambodia
Amphibians of Thailand
Amphibians described in 1922
Taxa named by Malcolm Arthur Smith
Taxonomy articles created by Polbot